The Awarua River is a short river that flows from the Waiuna Lagoon into Big Bay, also known as Awarua Bay, an embayment at the northern end of Fiordland in New Zealand. The river's mouth is at the northern end of Three Mile Beach, the Big Bay beach. One of the rivers that feeds Waiuna Lagoon is the Dry Awarua River.

The mouth of the Awarua River is the western end of the boundary between the West Coast Regional Council area and the Southland Regional Council area. It was formerly the boundary between Canterbury Province and Otago Province from when they were created in 1853.

References

Rivers of Fiordland